Sharon Bayes (later Speers, born 5 February 1965) is a Canadian former field hockey goalkeeper. She competed at the 1984 and 1988 Summer Olympics and finished in fifth and sixth place, respectively. She won a bronze medal at the 1987 Pan American Games.

References

External links
 
 
 

1965 births
Living people
Canadian female field hockey players
Female field hockey goalkeepers
Olympic field hockey players of Canada
Field hockey players at the 1984 Summer Olympics
Field hockey players at the 1988 Summer Olympics
Sportspeople from Etobicoke
Pan American Games bronze medalists for Canada
Pan American Games medalists in field hockey
Field hockey players at the 1987 Pan American Games
Medalists at the 1987 Pan American Games